Mighty Max was a series of toys that were manufactured by Bluebird Toys PLC in the UK in 1992. The toys were similar to the earlier Polly Pocket toyline; however, these toys were marketed primarily towards young boys. In Canada and the United States, they were distributed by Irwin Toy Limited and Mattel Inc. respectively. The original toyline consisted mainly of "Doom Zones" and "Horror Heads." "Doom Zones" were small playsets with a horror theme and featured miniature figurines of menacing creatures and the hero Max, a young boy with blond hair, jeans, a white t-shirt with a red "M" on it, and a baseball cap (the color varied based on the playset purchased) which also always had an "M" on it. The "Horror Heads" were smaller-sized playsets, also shaped like the heads of creatures and contained miniature figures. It was later adapted into a TV series, as well as a tie-in video game The Adventures of Mighty Max produced by Ocean Software for the Super NES and Mega Drive/Genesis.

Story
The background story of the toys was as follows:

Max's dad left him his old baseball cap. Trouble was, this was no ordinary baseball cap..."Gotta look the business" Max thought as he tweaked the cap's peak round to the side. "AAAARGH!" Suddenly, the world had gone weird and very unfriendly! The cap had changed colour! Something very strange was going on! He'd been caught in the Horror Zone. Stumbling from one terrifying adventure to another with only cryptic clues to help him escape...he was all alone. He was scared. But he was MIGHTY MAX, and he'd get back somehow!

Television series

In 1993 an American animated series was created based on the toys. After the series began to air the characters Virgil and Norman and toys based on episodes of the series were added to the toyline to form a new series. The story on the packaging was revised accordingly and a short-lived comic book series by Marvel UK was created as well. The appearance of Mighty Max changed considerably; Max was no longer portrayed as a young kid but as a young teenager with a long blonde hair, blue jeans, a red cap, and a white t-shirt similar to his portrayal in the television series. The older Doom Zones, Horror Heads and playsets were re-released with the original story replaced with the revised one:

Max was bright and pretty good at getting in and out of trouble, but he'd never forget the day he broke his Mom's mysterious old statue and found the Cosmic Cap inside. How was he to know it made him 'the Mighty One', able to travel instantly from place to place by means of time Portals? And how were Max, his Cosmic Cap and his two friends and protectors, wise old Virgil and fearless Norman gonna' measure up against the ultimate evil of the Skull Master!!?

Toys

Some of the toys featured a short comic on the back of the packaging summarizing Max's adventure in that zone. Most of the short comics feature roughly 10 panels.

Doom Zones
By far the most popular and recognisable range, the medium-sized Doom Zones usually contained around three to four set-exclusive figures along with a standard Max figure. Some playsets from the third series (particularly Cyberskull, Lizard and Nautilus) are relatively uncommon but the rest were all very widely produced. The original six playsets in Series 1 were later repackaged with a bonus Norman figure, and the six playsets in Series 2 were later repackaged with a bonus Hairy/Dread Head.

Series 1

Mighty Max Slays the Doom Dragon
Mighty Max Trapped by Arachnoid
Mighty Max Terminates Wolfship 7
Mighty Max Liquidates the Ice Alien
Mighty Max Escapes from Skull Dungeon
Mighty Max Conquers the Temple of Venom (renamed to Conquers the Palace of Poison in North America)

Series 2

Mighty Max Saves the Kingdom of Gargantua (renamed Tangles With the Ape King in North America)
Mighty Max Grapples with Hellcat (renamed Grapples With Battle Cat in North America)
Mighty Max Outwits Cyclops
Mighty Max Stings Scorpion (renamed Stings Scorpio in South Africa)
Mighty Max Blows Up Mutasaurus (renamed Blows Up Dino Lab in North America)
Mighty Max Caught in the Jaws of Doom (renamed Caught by the Man-Eater in North America)

Series 3

Mighty Max Sinks the Nautilus (also known as Sea Slug)
Mighty Max Bytes Cyberskull (also known as Cyro-Skull)
Mighty Max Squishes Fly
Mighty Max Traps Rattus
Mighty Max Lashes Lizard (also known as Lashes Geela Guts)
Mighty Max Grips the Hand (also known as Crushes the Hand)

Horror Heads
Essentially serving as smaller versions of Doom Zones, the Horror Heads usually contained around two set-exclusive figures along with a standard Max figure. Some playsets from the second series (specifically Beetlebrow, Talon, Rhesus 4 and Freako) are all relatively uncommon but the rest were all widely produced.

Series 1

 Mighty Max Against Droid Invader (renamed to Mighty Max Against Robot Invader in the USA)
 Mighty Max Battles Skull Warrior
 Mighty Max Challenges Lava Beast
 Mighty Max Defeats Nightwing (renamed to Mighty Max Defeats Vamp Biter in the USA)
 Mighty Max Fights Nuke Ranger
 Mighty Max Neutralises Zomboid
 Mighty Max Pulverizes Sea Squirm
 Mighty Max Versus Kronosaur

Series 2

 Mighty Max Hammers Spike (renamed Mighty Max Hammers Ax Man in North America)
 Mighty Max Hounds Werewolf
 Mighty Max Survives Corpus
 Mighty Max Tangles With Lockjaw

Series 3

 Mighty Max Zaps Beetlebrow
 Mighty Max Crushes Talon (renamed Mighty Max Crushes Clawber in North America)
 Mighty Max Out-Freaks Freako 
 Mighty Max Rams Rhesus 4 (renamed Mighty Max Rams Hydron in North America)

Monster Heads
The Monster Heads were playsets that were considerably smaller than even the Horror Heads, and did not actually open up. They each came with one set-exclusive monster figure (referenced in the name of the set - for example, the Zombie Commando Monster Head came with the Jack Knife monster) and a Max figure unique to that playset.

 Zombie Commando and Jack Knife
 Mecha Crawler and Octo-Slime
 Gorillabat and Ape Warrior
 Imperial Dragon and Samurai Serpent
 Phantasm and Dr. Destiny
 Basilisk and Zilard Beast

Hairy Heads (also known as Dread Heads)
The Hairy Heads were playsets that were really more accessories, heads with openable mouths that possessed a hinge on the back to be used to stand the head upright or attached to an object such as a school bag. They all had fuzzy hair on the top of their heads, hence the name Hairy Heads, and an included random Max figure could fit inside the mouth. Hairy Heads were only released on single cardbacks in the UK and Europe (where they were known as Scalps). In the US, they were called Dread Heads and released as bonuses with Doom Zones.

 Hemlock
 Karbon
 Anthrax 9
 Razorback (also known as Razor)
 Garrotid
 Eruptus (also known as Ruptus)
 Berserker (also known as Serker)
 Skull crusher

Shrunken Heads
The extremely small Shrunken Heads were fully openable, unlike the slightly bigger Monster Heads, but only came with an exclusive Max figure and no detachable monster figure to fight - instead simply an embossed decoration set against the interior of the set. The first eight sets were based on original creatures, while the remaining eight were based on episodes of the cartoon. The first eight originally came packaged in sets of two but later were released on separate cards by themselves. They were also available as cereal box prizes in some regions. This is why the first eight are relatively common, unlike the later eight which were released in much smaller numbers and are some of the rarest and sought-after sets within the series despite their small size.

 Bloodsucker (renamed Insectoid in North America)
 Lobotix (renamed Brainface in North America)
 Pharaoh's Curse (renamed Mummy King in North America)
 Venom (renamed Wraptile in North America)
 Rat Trap
 Meltdown (renamed Head Case in North America)
 Rok Monster
 Vampyre
 Skull Master
 Dr. Zygote
 Fang
 Conqueror
 Gargoyle
 Necrosaur
 Lava Lord
 Doom

Battle Warriors
These were action figures which transformed into small playsets, based on the same principle as the Mighty Max Blasts Magus playset (see below) but on a much smaller scale.

 Challenge #1 - Battle Conqueror (also known as Mighty Max Defeats the Conqueror)
 Challenge #2 - Double Demon (also known as Mighty Max Head to Head With Hydra)
 Challenge #3 - Lava Beast (also known as Mighty Max Melts Lava Beast)
 Challenge #4 - Pharaoh Phang (also known as Mighty Max Strikes Fang)
 Challenge #5 - Medi-Evil Mauler (also known as Mighty Max Shatters Gargoyle)
 Challenge #6 - Megahert (also known as Mighty Max Shuts Down Cybot)

Large-size playsets
Several larger Mighty Max playsets were released across the years, often being significantly less portable in nature but coming with an increased figure count and more playability.

Mighty Max Defies the Dread Star and Mighty Max Takes On Terror Talons are in fact the same playset, but came boxed differently and with different pieces. For instance, Dread Star featured a total of six alien villains, plus a "Skelemonster Robot" and a "Scavenger Vehicle." Terror Talons meanwhile had only five aliens, and no Scavenger Vehicle.

 Mighty Max Blasts Magus
 Mighty Max Defies the Dread Star
 Mighty Max Takes On Terror Talons
 Mighty Max Storms Dragon Island
 Mighty Max Trapped In Skull Mountain
 Mighty Max Assaults Skull Master Mega Head

Heroes & Villains
A total of six figure sets were released, each including Max, Norman, Virgil and various villains and monsters. The first three were simply repaints of pre-existing figures that came with recent Doom Zones and Horror Heads as well as from a few of the bigger playsets. The second three, however, were all-new figures done in the style of the cartoon.

 Featuring Skull Master
 Featuring Lava Lord
 Featuring Warmonger
 Featuring Battle Conqueror
 Featuring Medi-Evil Mauler
 Featuring Pharaoh Phang

McDonald's Playsets
Two Mighty Max playsets were released as part of McDonald's promotions. They are rather unique in that they are somewhat larger than a Horror Head but smaller than a Doom Zone, and come with no figures but instead have a unique feature inside. The 1993 Yeti playset has a Max figure that is fixed to the interior but can be rotated around with a dial, whereas the 1995 Ice Monster playset has a Max decoration that can be moved beneath a transparent surface to impact with two spinning Ice Monster decorations.

 Totally Toy Holiday 93 "Boys" Mighty Max Playset ('Yeti')
 Totally Toy Holiday 95 Mighty Max Playset ('Ice Monster')

Watch Playsets
A number of digital watches were made for the toyline, with a branded strap and openable face that resembled one of the Doom Zones. All of the watches are based on Series 1 Doom Zones, apart from the Lizard (which is from Series 3) and features a radically different strap and packaging.

Wolfship 7
Ice Alien
Skull Dungeon
Doom Dragon
Lizard

Other Merchandise 
There were multiple other Mighty Max branded items released across the tenure of the franchise, from electronic games to backpacks, though it can be difficult to discern what is and isn't official due to a lot of the products being released only in certain regions and/or with very minimal if any advertisement at all. Some items such as the board games and the electronic games are somewhat uncommon but still found from time to time, whereas other items such as the Squirt Heads are very rare.

 Skull Krusher Electronic Game (also known as Crusher)
Mighty Max in Skull Mountain Handheld Electronic Game [Systema]
Mighty Max Handheld Electronic Game [Tiger Electronics]
Mighty Max Watch and Clock Set
Mighty Max and the Crystal Quest Board Game
Mighty Max Ultimate Adventure Board Game
Mighty Max Super Battle Card Game
Mighty Max Jigsaw [RoseArt]
Mighty Max Pencil Case #1
Mighty Max Pencil Case #2
Mighty Max Backpack 
Mighty Max Zomboid Backpack
Skull Master Squirt Head
Warmonger Squirt Head
Lava Beast Squirt Head
Fang Squirt Head

Colour Variants 
A number of Mighty Max playsets were released throughout the different ranges featuring a different color scheme - in some both the set and the figures are different colors, and in others only the set is different. Although the name of the set and the box art is unchanged, the one exception to this rule is a black and red Ice Alien Doom Zone that was completely rebranded as Fire Alien.

Wolfship 7 Doom Zone: blue and green interior & silver exterior variant / and light grey exterior variant (aka First Edition).
Skull Dungeon Doom Zone: grey exterior variant (aka First Edition).
Doom Dragon Doom Zone: light green exterior variant (aka First Edition).
Ice Alien Doom Zone: black exterior and red interior (renamed Fire Alien).
Arachnoid Doom Zone: brown exterior variant (aka First Edition).
Scorpion Doom Zone: gold and purple exterior variant.
Hellcat Doom Zone: grey Interior variant (probably a prototype).
Corpus Horror Head: green variant.
Lockjaw Horror Head: blue variant.
Kronosaur Horror Head: red variant.
Talon Horror Head: blue variant.
Lava Beast Horror Head: light red variant.
Droid Horror Head: fluorescent variant.
Battle Warrior Conqueror: gold and red variant.
Skull Master Mega Head: pure black wing variant.
Doom Dragon Watch: light green variant.

Unreleased Toys

Into The Battle Zone 
A large number of 'Into The Battle Zone' sets were scheduled for release in 1996, but cancelled before release in the prototype phase. Due to the development that had already occurred, some relatively complete prototype models were in fact created and feature in the 1996 SKU List. The Warmonger and Doom Battle Fortresses in particular even appear in an officially released poster, and a number of prototype models have been found in the hands of collectors and merchants, suggesting these were far closer to release than the others which for the most part remain elusive.

Bold text below denotes a set for which at least one prototype model is known to currently exist, whereas italic text denotes a set which does not have an actual picture within the SKU List - suggesting that they did not even make it to the prototype phase. All the other sets in the list do have actual photos of prototypes featured within the SKU List, but it is unclear whether these models actually exist today.

Battle Fortresses (Rebranded Mega Heads)

Warmonger
Doom

Battle Warriors

 Arak
 Bat 
 Bounty Hunter 
 Ninja Samurai 
 Norman 
 Nosferatu 
 Stegoman

Battle Wheels

 Norman
 Arak
 Warmonger
 Conqueror

Battle Zones (Rebranded Doom Zones)

Mummy King
 Piranha
 Toad

Battle Arenas

 Snake Pit

Figure Packs

 Skull Masters Marauders
 Norman's Heroes
 Max's Avengers
 The Dark Company
 Unnamed Figure Pack #5
 Unnamed Figure Pack #6
 Unnamed Figure Pack #7

Variations 
More variations were planned for the previously released Doom Zones and Horror Heads, and even Shrunken Heads. Colour variations for three Series 1 Doom Zones - Skull Dungeon, Doom Dragon and Temple of Venom - were shown in a Mattel Toy Catalog but never actually released. More interestingly, there were a number of metallized sets planned, a first for the series - development images show metallized versions of the Skull Dungeon and Temple of Venom Doom Zones, the Vamp Biter, Lockjaw and Kronosaur Horror Heads, and the Mummy, Insectoid and Rat Trap Shrunken Heads.

Influence
On the trail of the popular Mighty Max, other companies would soon implement the miniature playset style into their merchandise for properties including Star Wars, Godzilla, and Batman Forever. Such toys would often feature a character's head as the unfolded playset and an environment familiar to the property at hand (i.e. Batman's head unfolding to reveal the Batcave). Galoob's popular Micro Machines line already bore a similar scale to Mighty Max and created a variety of miniature Star Wars "head" playsets ranging in size. Playmates Toys also introduced mini Teenage Mutant Ninja Turtles and Star Trek playsets in 1994 and continued producing them the following year.

References

 Original Story was obtained from a 1992 Irwin packaging of a Mighty Max Doom Zone.
 Revised Story was obtained from http://www.omegacron.com/mighty_max/toys.htm.
 Mighty Max Playset reference at Mike's Toybox

Further reading

External links
 Virtual Toy Chest entry

Products introduced in 1992
1990s toys
Transforming toys
1994 comics debuts
Marvel UK titles
Science fiction comics
Mattel
1992 establishments in the United Kingdom